The Canal Solar Power Project is a solar canal project launched in Gujarat, India, to use the  long network of Narmada canals across the state for setting up solar panels to generate electricity. It was the first ever such project in India. This project has been commissioned by SunEdison India.

Inauguration of pilot project
Narendra Modi, then Chief Minister of Gujarat, inaugurated a 1 Megawatt (MW) pilot project on 24 April 2012. The project is situated on the Narmada branch canal near Chandrasan village of Kadi taluka in Mehsana district.

Engineering and construction
The pilot project was developed on a 750-meter stretch of the canal by Gujarat State Electricity Corporation (GSECL) with support from Sardar Sarovar Narmada Nigam Ltd. (SSNNL), which owns and maintains the canal network.

The cost per megawatt of solar power, in this case, was much less than regular solar power plants, as the two banks of the canal will be used to cover the canal by installing solar power panel and the government did not have to spend much on creating basic infrastructure, including land acquisition .

This also implies that  of land can be potentially conserved along with about 20 billion liters of water saved per year.

Praise for the project
Then Union Minister for New and Renewable Energy Farooq Abdullah praised Gujarat's Canal Solar Power Project saying,

See also 

 Electricity sector in India
 Renewable energy in India
 Gujarat Solar Park
 Sakri PV solar energy project
 Jawaharlal Nehru National Solar Mission
 Dhirubhai Ambani Solar Park

References

External links
 Narendra Modi world’s first canal-top solar plant in Gujarat
 Solar PV Project on Narmada Canal in Gujarat to be inaugurated soon by Narendra Modi

Photovoltaic power stations in India
Solar power stations in Gujarat
2012 establishments in Gujarat